The World Figure Skating Championships is an annual figure skating competition sanctioned by the International Skating Union in which figure skaters compete for the title of World Champion.

The 1957 competitions for men, ladies, pair skating, and ice dancing took place from February 26 to March 2 in Colorado Springs, Colorado, USA.

Results

Men

Judges:
 W. Malek 
 P. Devine 
 Gérard Rodrigues-Henriques 
 Rudolf A. Marx 
 Pamela Davis 
 E. Kirschhofer 
 H. Janes

Ladies

Judges:
 Hans Meixner 
 J. McKechnie 
 Rudolf A. Marx 
 Pamela Davis 
 Bruno Bonfiglio 
 E. Kirchhofer 
 H. Storke

Pairs

Judges:
 Hans Meixner 
 J. McKechnie 
 G. Rodrigues-Henriques 
 Rudolf A. Marx 
 Pamela Davis 
 Bruno Bonfiglio 
 H. Janes

Ice dancing

Judges:
 W. Malek 
 P. Devine 
 D. Ward 
 E. Kirchhofer 
 R. Shoemaker

Sources
 Result List provided by the ISU

World Figure Skating Championships
World Figure Skating Championships
International figure skating competitions hosted by the United States
World Figure Skating Championships
World Figure Skating
World Figure Skating Championships
1950s in Colorado Springs, Colorado
Sports competitions in Colorado Springs, Colorado